Huff! It's Too Much is a 2013 Hindi film. It stars Marathi actor Pushkar Jog and Pakistani actress Armeena Khan in lead. The film was directed by Pushkar Jog himself and it released on 8 November 2013.

Cast 
Pushkar Jog
Armeena Khan
Omar Khan
Mona Kiren
Humayun Zubairi
Niks Vaja

Soundtrack

Reception

References

External links
 
 

2013 films
2010s Hindi-language films